Joan Marie Severance (December 23, 1958) is an American actress and former fashion model.

Early life
Severance was born in Houston, Texas, the daughter of Martha and John C. Severance. Her father was an IBM systems manager who had to move frequently around the world. "By the time I was 11," said Severance, "we'd lived in 12 different places." Her family and she also lived in Libya, but in 1967 had to flee the country because of the Six-Day War. They left the Middle East and returned to the United States, settling in Houston.

Severance attended Westbury High School, and at age 15, started modeling to make money for college. Although she hoped to become a veterinarian, she could not afford the cost of tuition. After appearing in the "Miss Houston" beauty contest, she was discovered by Alan Martin, a local photographer in Houston, who introduced her to John Casablancas. Casablancas signed her up with the Elite modeling agency and sent her on assignment to Paris. During this time, she met her future husband, model Eric Milan.

Career

Modeling
During her time in Paris, she posed for Sportswear International, Vogue Paris, and others. Upon her return to the United States, Severance became one of America's top models, filming over 40 commercials, and earning $7,500 per day. She has also modeled for Versace, Chanel, and Armani.

Severance was also on the covers of the January 1990 and November 1992 issues of Playboy magazine, both featuring her in a nude pictorial. More recently, at age 52, she appeared in a six-page editorial along with an interview in the Spring/Summer 2011 issue of Genlux magazine.

Acting
In 1986, Severance began auditioning for acting bits at the urging of her friend Robin Leach. She made her debut in a small role in the first Lethal Weapon film in 1987. She usually takes the "femme fatale" roles in low-budget horror and murder-mystery movies including Lake Consequence (1990), Bird on a Wire (1993), Criminal Passion (1994), and Payback (1995). She was featured alongside Richard Pryor and Gene Wilder in the 1989 comedy See No Evil, Hear No Evil, and as Hulk Hogan's love interest, Samantha N. Moore, in the wrestling film No Holds Barred (1989). She had leading roles in Roger Corman's Black Scorpion (1995). She starred in and co-produced the sequels Black Scorpion II: Aftershock (1997) and The Last Seduction II (1999).

She appeared in the Scorpions' video for their 1988 song, "Rhythm of Love."

Her most extensive role was a villainess for an eleven-episode story arc of the TV series Wiseguy; she played Susan Profitt, half of a brother/sister crime team (the other half was played by Kevin Spacey) to great acclaim. Their partnership was reprised in See No Evil, Hear No Evil. In the early 1990s, Severance appeared as Samantha "Sam" Dooley, the Martian Belle, in two training videos for Virtual World Entertainment alongside other actors such as Cheech Marin, "Weird Al" Yankovic, R. Lee Ermey, and Judge Reinhold. From 1998 to 1999, Severance played Security Chief Camille Hunter on the Aaron Spelling television series Love Boat: The Next Wave on UPN.

In 2006, Severance appeared in My Network TV telenovela Wicked Wicked Games. She was also in shows such as CSI: Miami and One Tree Hill. In 2013, she was in American Horror Story: Asylum. In 2014, she was on Celebrity Wife Swap with Robin Leach.

Personal life
Severance married fellow model Eric Milan in 1977. They separated amicably in 1984. According to Severance, they "just grew apart". Severance was diagnosed with vitiligo when she was eight years old; the primary area affected by the disease is her eyes.

Filmography

Film

Television

References

External links

Actresses from Houston
American female models
American television actresses
American film actresses
Living people
20th-century American actresses
21st-century American actresses
1958 births